West Union is a city in Todd County, Minnesota, United States. The population was 111 at the 2010 census.

History
West Union was platted in 1881 and incorporated in 1900. The West Union post office closed in 1996.

Geography

Interstate 94/U.S. Highway 52 serves as the main route in the community.

Demographics

2010 census
As of the census of 2010, there were 111 people, 42 households, and 31 families living in the city. The racial makeup of the city was 99.1% White and 0.9% from two or more races.

There were 42 households, of which 35.7% had children under the age of 18 living with them, 54.8% were married couples living together, 9.5% had a female householder with no husband present, 9.5% had a male householder with no wife present, and 26.2% were non-families. 23.8% of all households were made up of individuals, and 4.8% had someone living alone who was 65 years of age or older. The average household size was 2.64 and the average family size was 3.10.

The median age in the city was 35.8 years. 24.3% of residents were under the age of 18; 12.6% were between the ages of 18 and 24; 20.7% were from 25 to 44; 33.3% were from 45 to 64; and 9% were 65 years of age or older. The gender makeup of the city was 51.4% male and 48.6% female.

2000 census
As of the census of 2000, there were 87 people, 31 households, and 19 families living in the city. The racial makeup of the city was 100.00% White.

There were 31 households, out of which 41.9% had children under the age of 18 living with them, 51.6% were married couples living together, 3.2% had a female householder with no husband present, and 35.5% were non-families. 32.3% of all households were made up of individuals, and 6.5% had someone living alone who was 65 years of age or older. The average household size was 2.81 and the average family size was 3.70.

In the city, the population was spread out, with 40.2% under the age of 18, 3.4% from 18 to 24, 31.0% from 25 to 44, 9.2% from 45 to 64, and 16.1% who were 65 years of age or older. The median age was 32 years. For every 100 females, there were 112.2 males. For every 100 females age 18 and over, there were 116.7 males.

The median income for a household in the city was $24,643, and the median income for a family was $39,375. Males had a median income of $24,167 versus $19,375 for females. The per capita income for the city was $10,441. There were 15.8% of families and 23.1% of the population living below the poverty line, including 36.4% of under eighteens and 15.0% of those over 64.

References

Cities in Todd County, Minnesota
Cities in Minnesota